Dyschirius benedikti is a species of ground beetle in the subfamily Scaritinae. It was described by Bulirsch in 1995.

References

benedikti
Beetles described in 1995